Ludwig Bertalanffy describes two types of systems: open systems and closed systems. The open systems that we know of are systems that allow interactions between their internal elements and the environment. An open system is defined as a “system in exchange of matter with its environment, presenting import and export, building-up and breaking-down of its material components.” Closed systems, on the other hand, are held to be isolated from their environment. Equilibrium thermodynamics, for example, is a field of study that applies to closed systems.

The idea of open systems was further developed in systems theory.

Social science 
In social sciences, schematically, if there is an interaction or feedback loop between ideal and material or subjective and objective then the system is an open system, otherwise it is a closed system. A closed system offers a deterministic relationship. René Descartes’ view of a subject as a determining agent, detached from nature, is a closed system. Georg Wilhelm Friedrich Hegel’s view of the world that the idea determines the being is another example of a closed system (although the being then determines the new idea in the next stage of the dialectical process and the closure is therefore at the 'end of history'— in this sense Hegel's system is an open system). Raymond Williams’ open-ended approach and Pierre Bourdieu’s theory of practice suggest non-deterministic relationships and are thus open systems. Schematically, closed systems are the sphere of being, identity, theory, molar, information, normal, and past. Open systems offer becoming, difference, practice, molecular, noise, pathological, and present. In short, systems theory in social sciences is basically closing the gap between phenomenology and structuralism and instead searching for embedded hermeneutics in which the subject is not cut off from a society but weaved in a social context. Once the Cartesian subject, who imposed mental concepts on reality, is flattened out, then the task is how to actualize materiality.

One possible way of describing the non-subject-centered view of the world is through the organization. According to Gregory Bateson, "Relationship could be used as basis for definition." That is, instead of signifying things under the blanket terms, the thing should be described the way it is organized in a complex relationship. In other words, materiality should not be represented by us but through us. In social science, the network approach has been increasingly becoming popular to undertake such kind of non-representational framework. It flattens out the representational systems that have become deterministic. The interconnection automatically reveals spaces that are left unconnected or silenced under the abstract machine of signifiers. The study produced with this connection is a mere description of a complexity that is characteristic of a society. There is no politics involved in this. Politics implies categories and naming, which according to Bateson, is always classifying and thus reducing complexity of organization. "The organization of living things depends upon circular and more complex chains of determination." The interconnection of things thus becomes a new way of understanding the reality. Walter Benjamin's montage, Gilles Deleuze and Félix Guattari's assemblage, and Humberto Maturana's autopoiesis suggest that things should not be seen in terms of their functionality or physical properties but rather the relationship, circularity, or networks serve as a general criteria for the knowledge. The essay surveys various disciplines to demonstrate the ways in which the idea of difference or becoming has posed challenges against given conceptual categories within their respective fields.

Anthropology 

Although anthropology has been somewhat successful in displacing the modern subject from the center by observing various other institutions such as gift exchange and kinship, it continues to struggle with developing open systems. In anthropology, the open system raises the question of how to represent a native point of view. The idea behind the ethnographic writing is to understand a complexity of an everyday life of the people without undermining or reducing the native account. Historically, ethnographers insert raw data, collected in the fieldwork, into the writing "machine." The output is usually the neat categories of ethnicity, identity, classes, kinship, genealogy, religion, culture, violence, and numerous other. The systems theory, however, challenges, among other fields, the ethnographic writing that is usually focused on representing the Other.

Anthropologist Gregory Bateson is the most influential and earliest founder of the system theory in social sciences. Bateson describes system as “any unit containing feedback structure and therefore competent to process information.” Thus an open system allows interaction between concepts and materiality or subject and the environment or abstract and real. In natural science, systems theory has been widely used approach. Bateson's work influenced major post-structuralist scholars especially Gilles Deleuze and Felix Guattari. In fact, the very word 'plateau' in Deleuze and Guattari's magnum opus, A Thousand Plateaus, came from Bateson's work on Balinese culture. They wrote: "Gregory Bateson uses the word plateau to designate something very special: a continuous, self-vibrating region of intensities whose development avoids any orientation toward a culmination point or external end.” Bateson pioneered an interdisciplinary approach in anthropology. He coined the term “ecology of mind” to demonstrate that what "goes on in one's head and in one's behavior" is interlocked and constitutes a network. Guattari wrote: Gregory Bateson has clearly shown that what he calls the “ecology of ideas” cannot be contained within the domain of the psychology of the individual, but organizes itself into systems or “minds”, the boundaries of which no longer coincide with the participant individuals.

With the posthumanist turn, however, the art of ethnographic writing has suffered serious challenges. Anthropologists are now thinking of experimenting with a new style of writing – for instance, writing with natives or multiple authorship. It also undermines the discipline of identity politics and postcolonialism. Postcolonial scholars’ claims of subaltern identity or indigeneity and their demand of liberal rights from a state is actually falling back into the same signifying Western myth of Oedipal complex of ego and the Id. Instead of looking for a non-unitary subject in multiplicities organized into assemblage and montage; postcolonial studies limit flows into the same Western category of identity thus undermining the networks that sustain people's everyday lives. Deleuze and Guattari's rhizomatic and Benjamin's montage dismantle the top-down and hierarchical social reality and bring into attention the micro-politics of mapping multiplicities of networks and assemblages.

Linguistics 

One can also trace open and closed systems in linguistics. The two most obvious examples come from the work of Ferdinand de Saussure (1857-1913) and of Valentin Voloshinov (1895-1936).

Saussure, in seeking to discover universal laws of language, formulated a general science of linguistics by bifurcating language into  langue (abstract system of language), and parole (utterance or speech). The phonemes - the fundamental units of sound - provide the basic structure of a language. The linguistic community gives a social dimension to a language. Moreover, linguistic signs are arbitrary, and change only comes with time and not by individual will. The distinction of language between langue and parole without any feedback loop demonstrates that a  synchronic language is a closed system.

Voloshinov rejects abstract objectivism perpetuated by the language distinction between langue and parole. He also rejected the Cartesian notion of language as a mere manifestation of pure subjectivity. In fact, he dissolved the dichotomy of objectivity, language as external and independent of human consciousness, and subjectivity, language as a cognitive activity. The dissolution was to put the becoming of language in a practice of utterance. In other words, the language only comes to existence when uttered - not intentionally, but in a practice of everyday life. The meaning of language also comes into being in a particular context, thus putting language in its  ideological milieu. This is Voloshinov's most important theoretical intervention—in rendering language an ideologically laden mechanism. Since humans are social, the linguistic utterance also embodies  power relations. Voloshinov further writes on philology as a "finished monologic utterance—the ancient written monument". This illustrates how ideology is concealed in texts such as dictionaries that list words free of their particular contexts. Thus Voloshinov moves away from Saussure's static being to the idea of becoming.

History 

In the discipline of history, there have also been critical debates of how to represent past in its complexity without undermining the differences. That is what are the ways in which history writing could be written as an open system. Walter Benjamin's Theses on the Philosophy of History perhaps could be referred as one of the earliest radical explorations in the idea of the past and representation. Benjamin differentiates between historicism as a discipline that views past and present as separate from each other and temporality as a homogenous empty time moving in a linear fashion in search for an objective truth. This detached view of the history makes historian a master signifier who imposes concepts onto the materiality of the process. Historicism is thus a history of silences. Historical materialism, on the other hand, is the history of the present that is past and present are not detached from each other but constitutes a single interrupting and non-linear temporality. “History is the object of a construction whose place is formed not in homogenous and empty time, but in that which is fulfilled by the here-and-now [Jetztzeit].” Writing history of present that is now-here releases differences and multiplicities from the clutches of historical categories that impose silence. The now-time serves as a new temporality for the representation of the present. With the postmodernist turn, history writing has been suffering challenges of how to recover those silences marginalized under the systems of representation or historicism. Put simply, what are the ways the history of differences could be written that would rupture the official history? German historian, Reinhart Koselleck, based his argument on social and conceptual history. The social history belongs to a history of the present whereas conceptual history is the history of ideas or representations. Subaltern Studies historian, Dipesh Chakrabarty name the conceptual and social history as History 1 and History 2. Anthropologist, Michel-Rolph Trouillot, referred them as historicity 1 and historicity 2 and urges for a history of the present. Hayden White's idea of emplotment as narrative form demonstrates a new radical move towards history writing that collapses the traditional historical tropes.

Philosophy 

The debate in philosophy is grounded in terms such as abstract and real. To put simply, the question in philosophy could be written as how to get to reality without deploying the given abstract concepts. In contemporary philosophy, Deleuze's philosophy of becoming is currently a popular version. According to Deleuze and Guattari, "becoming is a verb with a consistency all its own; it does not reduce to, or lead back to, "appearing," "being," "equalizing," or "producing."" The becoming disrupts the imagination of the Western thought, organized in an arboreal, into a rhizomatic nature of haecceities. A Rhizome may be "broken, shattered at a given spot, but it will start up again on one its old lines or new lines."

In The Normal and the Pathological, Georges Canguilhem demonstrates the ways in which the concept of norm emerged as a reference point for organizing, or more precisely, normalizing differences into a normal order necessary for a general functioning of a liberal society. “A norm offers itself as a possible mode of unifying diversity, resolving a difference, settling a disagreement.” The norm thus became the abstract universal signifier and the normal as a signified and what "escapes" the normal is considered pathological. In fact, the existence of pathological becomes the necessary condition for the normal. By interconnecting the idea of norm with institutions of technology, economic, and juridical, Canguilhem grounds the concept of norm into the materiality of social and shows that normal is not a natural given but rather it is the product of normation.

Drawing on Canguilhem's work, Foucault develops the notion of biopolitics as an open system that is a process free of deterministic relationship. Biopolitics can be described as when the “basic biological features of the human species became the object of a political strategy of a general strategy of power.” The biopolitics becomes the governmental reason of modern society which Foucault referred as security society. The individualizing technique of the care of the self in the disciplinary society and the totalizing technique of the management of the population through apparatuses of security is called governmentality. The governmental apparatuses of security produce optimum risk or danger, which subjectivize individuals in terms of the care of the self and at the same time manage the population. Insurance technologies, as an apparatus of security for instance, use a calculus of probabilities that transform everything into risk, but most importantly, it “keep a type of criminality, theft for instance, within socially and economically acceptable limits and around an average that will be considered as optimal for a given social functioning.”  Thus, there are two streams of thought in Foucault's work. The earlier work relates to disciplining or individualizing of the body through the police state. The later thought develops around the notion of biopolitics, as a totalizing technique, that targets the biological given of the population through the apparatus of security. These two techniques, individualizing-totalizing, microphysics-macrophysics, care of the self-management of the population, are the two modalities of power that function in a non-deterministic relationship. It is a model different from Louis Althusser's idea of Ideological State Apparatuses as structure of dominance and hegemony functioning in a top-down manner. In Foucault's work, there is no top-down and bottom-up approach.

In Security, Territory, Population, Foucault developed the idea of milieu as a system consist of natural- river, water, earth, and artificial given-institutes, norms, discourses. The milieu is an idea similar to Vernadsky's biosphere as a realm of living. The biosphere or milieu has also been going through the process of social engineering. Foucault particularly focuses on space and demonstrates the ways in which urban forms have been subjected to discipline and regulation to enhance circulation. It seems that Foucault was moving towards the direction of bridging the gap between the nature and culture by proposing the idea of a milieu. This collapsing of given spaces also signifies that merely unpacking or de-centering the Cartesian subject will not be enough; in fact the milieu or biosphere requires careful collapsing into multiplicities. In general each discipline needs networking with materiality.

Sociology 

German theorist Niklas Luhmann develops a systems theory approach to society and demonstrates the ways in which systems work only in relation with their environment. Drawing on Humberto Maturana and Francis Varela's idea of autopoiesis and Hegelian dialectics, Luhmann argues that systems are self-referential autopoietic systems, that is they produce and reproduce their organization without getting input from a Cartesian subject and systems maintain their distinction from the environment by the unity of the difference. By doing that, he displaces the modern subject as a point of reference and instead places communication as the index. Schematically, a system represents a conceptual realm, a meaningful world, a place of identity, past, and actuality. Whereas environment signifies noise, meaninglessness, difference, future, and possibilities.  Luhmann's social systems are closed systems except when the system needs information from the environment. Thus, it is up to the system to select the meaninglessness or noise from the environment and encode it into a meaningful complex in the system. Although Luhmann maintains the unity of the difference of the system and environment, the closing of the system does not allow innovation or rupture in the order. In fact, the encoding of information in the system reduces complexity of the environment.

French sociologist Pierre Bourdieu challenges the same duality of phenomenology (subjective) and structuralism (objective) through his Theory of Practice. This idea precisely challenges the reductive approach of economism that places symbolic interest in opposition to economic interests. Similarly, it also rejects subjected-centered view of the world. Bourdieu attempts to close this gap by developing the concept of habitus, "a system of durable, transposable dispositions."   In this system, agent is not a conscious subject but "the schemes of thought and expression he has acquired are the basis for the intentionless invention of regulated improvisation."   Symbolic capital, for instance, a prestige, as readily convertible back into economic capital and hence, is ‘the most valuable form of accumulation.’ Therefore, economic and symbolic both work together and should be studied as a general science of the economy of practices. Unlike Pierre Bourdieu, who provides a general theory of practice that regulates subjective (phenomenology) and objective (structuralism), or in Luhmann's terms systems and environment, together in an open system, Luhmann develops a closed system only letting the systems select its information from the environment. The more radical approach of Deleuze and Guattari completely collapses Hegelian dialectics by actualizing the materiality of the deterritoralized environment over on the territorialized systems.

Bruno Latour develops the open system by flattening out the discipline of sociology, ingrained in phenomenological tradition, into multiplicities embedded in the society. The de-centering of a Cartesian subject from the center of the universe open new spaces that were left unconnected by classical sociological tradition. Latour thus suggest an Actor-network theory to bridge the gap between the nature and culture. He rejects theoretical or conceptual models; in fact he dislike the fact that the description of anything has to fit in some kind of a framework. Theory, for Latour, is a mental projection of a modern subject which reduced the materiality of things into neat categories of groups and identities which, more precisely, violates the polymorphous nature of society. The network thus emerges as a new transcendental ego or what Humberto Maturana called a network theology.

Jürgen Habermas brings the intersubjective centered view of the world. He develops a communicative theory as a closed system. That is there exist a consensus which could only be validated by the communication among individuals. It gives primacy to a certain group of people who have access to a public space and who could communicate in a dominant language of a given context. There is no interaction between the speech act and the consensus. Thus, Habermas communication theory is a consensus driven closed system. It is the attempt to rescue the Enlightenment project embedded in logocentrism.

See also 
 Systems theory
 Complex systems
 Systems science
 Systemography
 Social systems
 Systems theory in anthropology

References

Systems theory